The Grand Makki Mosque of Zahedan is the largest Sunni mosque in Iran and is located in the center of Zahedan, the capital of the province Sistan and Baluchestan.

History

The founder of the mosque was Maulana Abd al-Aziz Mullahzada who until his death in 1987 had the most important Sunni religious authority of the Baloch in Sistan-Balochistan in Iran. The Makki Mosque was founded as part of the Jamiat Darul Uloom seminary which is located next to the Makki mosque. The Darul Uloom is part of the Deobandi School.

The Darul Uloom in Zahedan is the center for the Sunni Baloch people who live in eastern Iran. From its founding in the early 1970s, it has become the center of a network of thousands of mosques in the region, 120 Deobandi madrasas and about seventy seminaries of which forty are under direct leadership of the Zahedan-based Darul Uloom.

For years the mosque was overcrowded with a large numbers of worshippers and its space was inadequate for everyone to be able to pray inside the mosque. Often prayers had to be offered on the nearby streets. An expansion project was started which made the Makki mosque the largest Sunni mosque in Iran after completion. In 2010, the old mosque building with its two minarets had to be demolished to make room for the new 50,000 square meters mosque with four minarets.

Annual gatherings and conferences in the Makki mosque attract large numbers of Deobandi and other Sunni scholars from Iran and neighboring countries like Afghanistan and Pakistan. These gatherings and conferences have often prominent Deobandi speakers like the president of the Darul'Uloom in Karachi and speakers linked to the Tablighi Jamaat.

Leadership 
The founder of the Makki mosque Maulana Abd-al-Aziz Mullahzada (1916–1987) was a well-respected Deobandi scholar. He was the major proponent of the spread of the Deobandi thought in Sistan-Baluchistan. His influence kept growing and after being acknowledged as the religious authority of the Baluch people, his religious authority spread all over the Sunni communities in Iran.

After the death of Abd-al-Aziz Mullahzada in 1987, his son-in-law, Maulavi Abdul Hamid took over the reins of the Darul Uloom and was honored with the title Sheikh ul-Islam of Zahedan.

Gallery

See also
 Islam in Iran

References

21st-century mosques
Sunni mosques
Deobandi mosques
Mosques completed in the 1970s
Mosques completed in 1971
Mosques in Iran
Mosque buildings with domes
Buildings and structures in Sistan and Baluchestan Province
Zahedan
Makki